Dinesh Chandra Gupta ( Dinesh Chôndro Gupto) or Dinesh Gupta (6 December 1911 – 7 July 1931) was an Indian revolutionary against British rule in India, who is noted for launching an attack on the Secretariat Building - the Writers' Building in the Dalhousie square in Calcutta, along with Badal Gupta and Benoy Basu.

Rabindrasangeet exponent and trainer Maya Sen (maiden name Gupta) was his own niece. Even he suggested his sister-in-law Ashalata Gupta to let Maya learn Rabindrasangeet. His nephew and Maya's brother Dr. Tapan Gupta was a doctor and established 'the Tagoreans' in London. Mr. Gupta's daughter is an MBE, Tanika Gupta, a playwright and regularly works for BBC and the stage in England.

Early activities
Dinesh Gupta was born on 6 December 1911 in Josholong in Munshiganj District, now in Bangladesh. While he was studying in Dhaka College, Dinesh joined Bengal Volunteers - a group organised by Subhas Chandra Bose in 1928, at the occasion of Calcutta session of the Indian National Congress. Soon the Bengal Volunteers transformed itself to a more active revolutionary association and planned to assassinate certain Indian Imperial Police officers. For a short while, Dinesh Gupta was in Midnapore training local revolutionaries in the use of firearms. Revolutionaries trained by him were responsible for the assassination of three District Magistrates in succession, Douglas, Burge, and Peddy.

The battle of Writers' Building
The association targeted Lt Col NS Simpson, the Inspector General of Prisons, who was infamous for his mistreatment of the prisoners in the jails. The revolutionaries decided not only to murder him, but also to strike a terror in British colonial circles by launching an attack on the Secretariat Building - the Writers' Building in the Dalhousie Square in Kolkata.

On 8 December 1930, Dinesh, along with Benoy Basu and Badal Gupta, dressed in European costume, entered the Writers' Building and shot dead Simpson. Nearby police started firing at them in response. What ensued was a brief gunfight between the three young revolutionaries and the police. Some other officers like Twynam, Prentice, and Nelson suffered injuries during the shooting.

Soon police overpowered them. However, the three did not wish to be arrested. Badal Gupta took Potassium cyanide, while Benoy and Dinesh shot themselves with their own revolvers. Benoy was taken to the hospital where he died on 13 December 1930.

The trial and hanging
However, Dinesh survived the near-fatal injury. He was convicted and sentenced to death.

While in Alipore Jail, he wrote letters to his sister which were later compiled into the book 'Ami Shubhash Bolchhi'. He was hanged on 7 July 1931 at Alipore Jail.  Soon after that, Kanailal Bhattacharjee took revenge for the hanging by killing Mr. Galik (the judge of the Dinesh Gupta case) on 27 July 1931.

Writings 
Dinesh Gupta translated a short story of Anton Chekhov which was published in Prabasi Magazine. He also wrote 92 letters from the condemned cell of the Alipur Central Jail. A few to his sister in law (boudi) Ashalata Gupta.

Significance
Benoy, Badal, and Dinesh were treated as martyrs by supporters in Bengal and other parts of India. After independence, Dalhousie Square was named B. B. D. Bagh - after the Benoy-Badal-Dinesh trio. In memory of their writers' attack, a plate was engraved in the wall of Writers' Building, first floor.

Bibliography
 Hemendranath Dasgupta, Bharater Biplab Kahini, II & III, Calcutta, 1948;
 Ramesh Chandra Majumdar, History of the Freedom Movement in India, III, Calcutta 1963;
 Ganganarayan Chandra, Abismaraniya, Calcutta, 1966.

References

External links 

 https://en.banglapedia.org/index.php/Gupta,_Dinesh_Chandra

1911 births
1931 deaths
Revolutionaries of Bengal during British Rule
Anti-British establishment revolutionaries from East Bengal
People from Munshiganj District
Indian revolutionaries
Executed revolutionaries
People from Kolkata
Revolutionary movement for Indian independence
20th-century executions by the United Kingdom
Executed Indian people
People executed by British India by hanging
Indian independence activists from West Bengal